KGRE may refer to:

 KGRE (AM), a radio station (1450 AM) licensed to serve Greeley, Colorado, United States
 KGRE-FM, a radio station (102.1 FM) licensed to serve Estes Park, Colorado